Mardol is a census town in Ponda taluka, North Goa district in the state of Goa,
India.

The Marathi and Portuguese languages radio playwright and short-story writer Ananta Rau Sar Dessai lived and practiced medicine in Mardol.
Mardol is a fast-growing town in Goa. Mardol and Mangueshi are twin towns. The late Vasantrao Velingkar, the first MLA of Marcaim, who sacrificed his post for Dayanand Bandodkar, who became Chief Minister, lived in Mardol.
Mardol has a football team playing in the Third Division in Goa.

Main attraction
The Mahalasa Narayani Temple, dedicated to the goddess Mahalasa, is located at Mardol in Ponda is one of the most famous temples in Goa.

Transport  

Panaji is 21 kilometers from Mardol and Ponda is 9.2 kilometers away. Many inter-state government run and privately operated buses travel through Mardol.Nearby travelling villages are Kunkolim, Veling, Priol.

References

Cities and towns in North Goa district
Villages in North Goa district